Halbert Stevens Greenleaf (April 12, 1827 – August 25, 1906) was an American Civil War veteran and politician who served two non-consecutive term as a U.S. Representative from New York from 1883 to 1885, and again from 1891 to 1893.

Biography 
Born in Guilford, Vermont, Greenleaf attended the common schools and completed an academic course.
He moved to Shelburne Falls, Massachusetts, and engaged in the manufacture of locks.
He was appointed Justice of the Peace in 1856.
He served as captain of Massachusetts Militia in 1857.
Organized the Yale &
Greenleaf Lock Co..

Civil War 
Enlisted as a private in the Union Army in August 1862.
Commissioned captain of Company E, Fifty-second Regiment, Massachusetts Volunteers, September 12, 1862.

Greenleaf was elected colonel of the regiment October 23, 1862.

After the war 
He was employed in a salt works near New Orleans, Louisiana, for several years.
He settled in Rochester, New York, in 1867 and resumed the manufacture of locks.

Congress 
Greenleaf was elected as a Democrat to the Forty-eighth Congress (March 4, 1883 – March 3, 1885).
He was an unsuccessful candidate for reelection in 1884 to the Forty-ninth Congress.

Greenleaf was elected to the 52nd United States Congress (March 4, 1891 – March 3, 1893).
He was not a candidate for renomination in 1892.

Later career and death 
He resumed his former business activities until retirement in 1896.
He died at his summer home in the town of Greece, near Charlotte, New York, on August 25, 1906. He and his wife Jean Brooks Greenleaf, a noted suffragist, were interred in Mount Hope Cemetery, Rochester, New York.

External links

1827 births
1906 deaths
Union Army colonels
Democratic Party members of the United States House of Representatives from New York (state)
19th-century American politicians
People from Guilford, Vermont
People from Shelburne Falls, Massachusetts
People from Charlotte, New York